Australian rules football in England is a team sport and spectator sport with a long history. The annual match between Oxford and Cambridge Universities is the longest running Australian rules fixture outside Australia. The current competitions originated in 1989 and have grown to a number of local and regional leagues coordinated by AFL England. In 2018, these regional divisions were the AFL London, AFL Central & Northern England and Southern England AFL. 

The sport's origins are said to be in England, specifically public school football games. Several of the sport's founders were born and educated there including J. B. Thompson, William Hammersley and James Bryant while Tom Wills held by many as the sport's founder, was educated at and played rugby with the Rugby School. The sport however struggled for decades to establish roots given the dominance of traditional football codes in rugby football and the growing popularity of soccer. Nevertheless, it was one of the first countries outside of Australia to commence regular competition during the 1920s.

Australian Football League (AFL) exhibition matches were held in London semi-annually between 1986 and 2006 (the last standalone event was held in 2012) and were well attended with attendances ranging from 4,500 to a record of 18,884 in 2005.

England rarely competes in a standalone team, and is typically represented along with Scotland and Wales as the Great Britain team at the Australian Football International Cup (best result 6th) and AFL Europe Championship (2 titles). However, an English side has competed in several standalone tests and has been successful at the Euro Cup with 5 titles. Nevertheless, London has hosted several internationals, including the 2001 Atlantic Alliance Cup, 2005 and 2015 EU Cups and the 2016 and 2019 AFL Europe Championships.

In the AFL Bill Eason and Clive Waterhouse hold the record for the most games and goals with 220 and 386 respectively while current AFL Women's player Sabrina Frederick holds both records with 59 and 26.

History of Australian rules football in England

English involvement in the game's establishment in Australia

According to the AFL, the sport's origins were in England with public school football games being adopted by Australians in the 1850s leading to the creation of what is now known as Australian Football in Melbourne in the British Colony of Victoria in 1859. Several of the sport's founders were English including J. B. Thompson, William Hammersley and James Bryant, with Tom Wills having been educated at and played rugby football with the Rugby School.

Writing to Wills in 1871, Thompson recalled that "the Rugby, Eton, Harrow, and Winchester rules at that time (I think in 1859) came under our consideration, ... we all but unanimously agreed that regulations which suited schoolboys ... would not be patiently tolerated by grown men." The hardness of the playing fields around Melbourne also influenced their thinking. Even Wills, who favoured many rules of Rugby School football, saw the need for compromise. He wrote to his brother Horace: "Rugby was not a game for us, we wanted a winter pastime but men could be harmed if thrown on the ground so we thought differently."

While the game found its way to Ireland in the 1870s and there was also some awareness in England of the popularity of the game in Australia, it was not established locally until much later. This is primarily due to the growing popularity of locally developing football codes including rugby football and later British Association (soccer) which, like Australian Football, were also developing from public school football games.

The English were also heavily involved in the development of the code in the Colony of South Australia in particular John Acraman and Richard Twopeny.

Early efforts at introduction to England
Between 1870 and World War I many overseas students studied medicine in Scotland, and some went down to England to play the Australian Rules teams in that country.

A Lancashire paper from 1881 mentions a local initiative to introduce "Victorian Rules Football" to England as an alternative to rugby and Association football.

In 1883, during a visit to Australia, English journalist and rugby player Richard Twopeny wrote of the game:

A good football match in Melbourne is one of the sights of the world... The quality of the play... is much superior to anything the best English clubs can produce... there is much more 'style' about the play.

In 1884 H C A Harrison then known as the "father of Australian Football" visited London where he proposed unifying Australian rules with Rugby under a set of hybrid rules and suggested that rugby clubs adopt some of the Victorian Rules. English football officials expressed their insult at the suggestion that they "abandon their rules to oblige an Antipodean game".

Nevertheless when first proposing a football tour of Australia and New Zealand in March 1887, James Lillywhite, Alfred Shaw and Arthur Shrewsbury posited that the best way to ensure the success of the venture would be to play under the Australian rules where the sport was most popular.

Australians studying at Edinburgh University and London University formed teams and competed in London in 1888.
Spurred on by the upcoming English football team's tour of Australia, a scratch match between Edinburgh Australians and London Australians was planned to be held at Balham on 14 April 1888. However the match was postponed citing lack of player numbers and suitability of the venue. It was finally played on 26 May 1888 at Balham, London won 4 goals to 2. There was little interest in the match outside of the Australian expat community. However the game was poorly organised and the selected ground was so out of the way that most spectators failed to find it, proving to be lost opportunity to promote the game. A return match was played on the same ground on the 30th May resulting in a draw. The match drew considerable praise in UK newspapers such as the Times and the Scotsman.

British tours to Australia (1888–1914)

Australian rules football was played by a British representative rugby team which toured Australia in 1888. The team arrived in Hobart, Tasmania on 18 April. They attended a social function with the Southern Tasmanian Football Association, before going to New Zealand for a series of rugby matches.

After they returned to Australia they again trained in Australian rules in Sydney, before leaving for Victoria in mid-June. The tour included 19 matches.  They played against several of the stronger football clubs from Melbourne including the Carlton Football Club, South Melbourne Football Club, Essendon Football Club, Fitzroy Football Club and Port Melbourne Football Club.  Additionally, they played against some strong regional Victorian clubs including two teams from the city of Ballarat: Ballarat Football Club and Ballarat Imperial Football Club, as well as two teams from the city of Bendigo: Bendigo Football Club and Sandhurst Football Club as well as playing against clubs from other regional towns including the Castlemaine Football Club, Maryborough Football Club, Horsham Football Club and Kyneton Football Club.

The team also played against several of the stronger South Australian teams including South Adelaide Football Club, Port Adelaide Football Club, Adelaide Football Club (no connection to the later Adelaide club), Norwood Football Club.  The only club from outside of Victoria or South Australia which played against them was the Maitland Football Club (from the Hunter Region in New South Wales). The British team won six matches, including a win over Port Adelaide at Adelaide Oval on 10 July 1888, and drew one.

The reigning Victorian premiers, Carlton defeated Great Britain at the MCG 14.17 to 3.8. At this stage goals and points were recorded but only goals counted in the score; for example, when Great Britain played Castlemaine under very heavy conditions they kicked 1 goal 2 points and the locals kicked 1 goal 4 points, but the match was declared a draw. Great Britain also played 35 games of rugby, making a total of 54 games in 21 weeks. A star of the team's Australian rules games was Andrew Stoddart, who captained the team for part of its tour and also captained England in cricket.

The 1888 tour had been organised by the English cricketer Arthur Shrewsbury but his involvement with Australian Rules football did not end there. He planned to have an Australian team sent to the United Kingdom to play a series of demonstration matches and to that end he looked to Scotland where he had identified possible opponents. Shrewsbury's plans are outlined in his correspondence with Alfred Shaw and Turner, the Nottingham Cricket Club Secretary.

First Competitions 
Shrewsbury suggested that the 'Edinburgh Australians' team at Edinburgh University should travel down to England to meet the Australian team in a series of demonstration matches in Lancashire and Yorkshire. Unfortunately his bold plan did not eventuate as the authorities in Australia aborted the venture and a possible expansion of Australian Rules in the UK was lost.

In 1894, a dramatic costume football match was played at the East Melbourne Cricket Ground involving prominent English celebrities Jennie Lee, Wallace Brownlow and Harry Musgrove.

There were reports from Australia that the game was being played in England between two clubs in 1903 and in 1904. By 1906 there were three clubs holding regular competition two of which were in London. The Oxford University Australian Rules Football Club was founded in 1906.

As early as 1911 the game was being played regularly at Oxford. In 1911 Oxford University captained by Alfred Clemens defeated Cambridge University captained by Ron Larking 13.9 (87) to 5.12 (42). In 1914, H C A Harrison reported that the game was being played regularly at both Oxford and Cambridge universities though few records exist of contests between 1911 and 1921.

World War I 

In 1915 a Victoria vs South Australia match was played at Portland Canteen ground at Weymouth, Dorset.

In 1916, one of the highest profile matches in the history of the game outside of Australia occurred when a match was held at the Queen's Club in London between Australian Army teams, representing the Combined Training Units and the 3rd Division, in which many senior Australian rules footballers from all over Australia took part. The match drew a large crowd and significant press coverage.

As a celebration of Australia Day January 1918, a match was held at Cambridge between London Headquarters and Australian Cadets, with London winning 80 to 63.

However, the end of World War I saw the game outside of the universities go into hiatus.

Varsity matches between Oxford and Cambridge 

After the war, in 1921, the Oxford University–Cambridge University Varsity match between expatriate Australian students became an annual contest. This game is still played, and is the longest running Australian rules fixture outside Australia. The match is an official Varsity competition.  Over the years, some distinguished Australians to have played in the match include Mike Fitzpatrick, Chris Maxwell, Joe Santamaria, Sir Rod Eddington and Andrew Michelmore.

Men's Results

In 2018, amid the growth of the sport in England, there was the first ever women's Australian Rules Football Varsity, ending in a tie.

Women's Results

Second World War matches

The AIF played a match in 1940 between the "Impossibles" and the "Improbables".

When th RMS Moreton Bay returned to England after 1941 it played in advertised matches at Portsmouth.

RAAF (Sunderland) vs RAF Mount Batten was played in 1943 in Plymouth. In November of the same year, a game was played in Sussex between No.11 Personnel despatch and Reception centre team based in Brighton vs RAAF Headquarters from London.

Teams representing RAAF, Headquarters vs Sunderland, met in Hyde Park in 1944 in front of a sizeable crowd.  Headquarters defeated Sunderland 12.7 (79) to 5.4 (34).

In 1945, HMAS Australia defeated RAAF at Dulwich 11.12 to 10.5.

In 1948 Australia's champion axemen team announced its plans to introduce Australian rules football into England.

In 1952, a match was played at Rosslyn Park F.C. in South West London between HMAS Vengeance and English-Australians ("the Wombats"). The Wombats also organised a match at Cambridge.

The first local league
In 1967, Australian expatriates including Michael Cyril Hall and Ted Ford attempted to organise Australian Football in London. Ted engaged high-profile expatriate Australians including Rolf Harris, Alan Freeman, Barry Humphries, Neil Hawke, Keith Miller and former Australian prime minister Sir Robert Menzies to support the venture and raise publicity for it. Ford organised a charity match was played in Regent's Park in London, between local club Kensington Demons and established out of town club Oxford University. Athol Guy (who had played VFL reserves with St Kilda) also made a special appearance as a player. The match also featured England's first all-women's match between Aussie Girls and Wild Colonial Girls as a curtain raiser. The match attracted a crowd of 1,000 spectators. A follow up match between Earl's Court Magpies and Australian Dentists attracted 700 spectators. By May 7 established local teams were ready to form a local league these teams included: Australian Dentists, Australian Navy, Oxford University, Cambridge University, Kensington Demons, Earls Court Magpies and London House. In July, Royal Australian Navy (RAN) personnel played against a combined side drawn from the Earls Court Magpies; Kensington Demons and Australian Dentists in front of a crowd of 1,200 at Regent's Park. RAN personnel would go on to play against local school sides and local rugby clubs.

After some time finding its roots, the Australian National Football League (UK) was formed which by 1970 had six teams, Victorians; Rest of Australia; Portsmouth Naval Base; Plymouth Naval Base; London Gaelic Football Club and Hampstead Rugby Club with matches played in the summer.
The later inclusion of two English rugby sides was helping them keep fit in the off-season. Later clubs to play in the league included the Kensington Demons, Earls Court Magpies, Oxford University Blues, Australian Dentists and Australian Navy (based in Portsmouth).

In 1972, the first exhibition match of the VFL was played at The Oval in London as part of the Carlton Football Club 1972 preseason World Tour. The match attracted 9,000 in a carnival like atmosphere. However the arrival of the spectacle of elite level VFL also saw the end of the game at the grassroots in England with no further organised competition.

The VFL/AFL annual exhibition 
Between 1987 and 2006, VFL/AFL exhibition matches had become an almost annual event, but the only game since then being in 2012.
With a large number of ex-patriate Australians, interest in the game grew and small crowds of up to 10,000 were in attendance for the event in some years.
Interest and crowds grew further with the change of the VFL to the Australian Football League. 
Highlights during this time included large crowds for the Australian Football League's West Coast Eagles v. Collingwood in 1997 with an attendance of 14,000 and the match between Richmond and Essendon in 2002 which drew 13,000.

The British Australian Rules Football League: 1989-Present

In 1989 the British Australian rules football League (BARFL) was formed. Serious competition began. A schools program was launched in 1991. One of the key people in the establishment of the competition was former professional Australian player Darren Ogier who helped introduce a rule that at least half of the club's players onfield must be non-Australian. As the competition became more popular, results were reported in Australia. From 1992, the AFL began contributing AUD $6,000 a year to the league, however withdrew its financial contributions in 1994, expressing a preference for grants to be spent on junior programs and school projects instead of the senior competition. Despite the lack of AFL support, local BARFL Grand Finals become a large event attracting attendances in the thousands, including a record crowd of 1,500 in 1999.

In 2002 a national team represented Great Britain at the Australian Football International Cup for the first time, finishing the tournament in 6th place. 2005 saw the British Bulldogs again compete in the International Cup, again finishing 6th overall.

Following the 2005 International Cup, promising 22-year-old British Bulldog Luke Matias began playing with the Port Melbourne Football Club in the Victorian Football League.

Also in 2005, the first Western Derby to be played outside of Australia, the West Coast Eagles v. Fremantle game was played as a pre-season test at The Oval in London, drawing a record crowd of 18,884.

Junior Development programs

In 2005 the first junior development program, Aussie Rules Schools, commenced. The program, co-ordinated by the new development body Aussie Rules UK, part of Aussie Rules International was kicked off. This project has seen up to 10 English schools adopt Aussie Rules as part of the school curriculum to combat obesity.  Juniors teams have competed at the London Youth Games.

2006 was a big year for Aussie Rules in England, with the admission of new clubs in Manchester, Middlesbrough and Thanet.

On 17 September 2006 history was made in Denmark when the England Dragonslayers took on the Denmark Vikings in Europe's first fully-fledged international junior Aussie Rules match.  England claimed the King Canute Cup, with England 6.10(46) defeating Denmark 0.6(6).

In July 2007, the AFL announced that the annual London exhibition match was likely to be abandoned for the year, after only the Western Bulldogs had expressed interest.

In a first in 2007, the GB Bulldogs including several past and future England players, soundly defeated Ireland in Dublin 11.15(81) to 2.9(21).

AFL Britain
In 2008, a resolution to the divide between the two competing leagues saw a single national body, AFL Britain form, which formally affiliated to the AFL.  The BARFL was dissolved and became AFL London, while regional leagues including the Scottish Australian Rules Football League and the Welsh Australian Rules Football League affiliated with the new national body.

AFL England
In 2012, AFL England was formed as the national governing body for Australian rules football in England, separate to AFL Scotland and AFL Wales.

Participation
In 2004, there were a total of around 435 senior players across 18 clubs in England.  The local league has a higher number of ex-patriate Australians compared to other countries that participate in the sport, however the league recently put in place caps on the number of expatriate players in certain divisions to improve the mix and encourage more local players.

By the end of 2007, the game had experienced substantial growth due to the placement of permanent development officers.  AFL International Census figures indicate over 3,600 participants

Audience

Television

Australian rules football is regularly shown on BT Sport.

Attendance records

Local competitions
1,500 (1999). BARFL Grand Final. West London Wildcats vs Wandsworth Demons. London

Exhibition match
18,884 (2005). West Coast v. Fremantle (The Oval, London)

National teams
AFL England currently manages four national teams. The Great Britain Bulldogs and Great Britain Swans compete every three years at the International Cup in Melbourne. The squad is made up of players mainly from the London clubs, however they are often joined by players competing in Australia. In 2017 the Bulldogs finished sixth, their joint-highest finish, while in their maiden year the Swans finished third, defeating the United States 5.2 (32) to 4.1 (25)

The English teams are known as the England Dragonslayers and the England Vixens. Both teams won the AFL Europe Euro Cup in 2017. In 2018, the Vixens finished runners-up

Clubs

Open

London

Regional England

Juniors
 Clapham Cubs

Players

Men's

Women's

as of 2019 AFLW season

See also

 1916 Pioneer Exhibition Game
 Australian rules football in the United Kingdom
 Sport in England

External links
Surrey Cricket AFL annual exhibition match at 'The Oval'
AFL Britain website
BARFL website
ARUK National League
Aussie Rules UK
Cambridge University Australian Rules Football Club
Oxford University Australian Rules Football Club
Video of Aussie Rules from YouTube
The Birmingham Bears
 sports on ESPN UK link.
 subscribe to ESPN UK link.

Books

References